Butler, Texas, is the name of two unincorporated communities in the United States:

 Butler, Bastrop County, Texas
 Butler, Freestone County, Texas